

Historical events 

The first written mention of the Kholodnyi Yar belongs to historians who described the battles of Lithuanian and soldiers of Kievan Rus' with the Horde in 1363-1367 on the “Blue Water”.

Due to the dangerous proximity of the Wild Field, the incessant attacks of nomadic tribes, these lands were uninhabited for a long time. Individual fortress cities and well-fortified monasteries for centuries were the only settlements from Kaniv and Cherkasy to the Dnipro rapids.

Haidamaka uprisings 
In the 30s of the XVIII century, the Kholodnyi Yar Sich was organized in Kholodnyi Yar. This forest became the main base of the haidamaks for decades.

Literature 

 Енциклопедія українознавства : Словникова частина : [в 11 т.] / Наукове товариство імені Шевченка ; гол. ред. проф., д-р Володимир Кубійович. — Париж—Нью-Йорк : Молоде життя, 1955—1995.
 Джулай, Дмитро. Живі образи українського села: віднайдено унікальний фотоархів Івана Литвина // Радіо «Свобода», 12 грудня 202
 Довідник з історії України / за ред. І. З. Підкови, Р. М. Шуста. — К. : Генеза, 2001. — .
 Ушета І. І. Стежками Холодного Яру. Київ, 1988;
 Дубрава Ю. У Холодному Яру знову б'є цілюще джерело // Нова доба. — 2001. — 28 груд. — С.2;
 Лебідь І. У центрі п'яти ярів — колиска нашої волі // Нова доба. — 1999. — 2 лист. — с.4-5;
 Лисенко С. Холодний Яр стане національним парком // Молодь Черкащини. — 2000.- 16 листоп. — С.12
 Морозов А. Г. Холодний Яр // Енциклопедія історії України : у 10 т. / редкол.: В. А. Смолій (голова) та ін. ; Інститут історії України НАН України. — К. : Наукова думка, 2013. — Т. 10 : Т — Я. — С. 408-410. — 784 с. : іл. — .
 Негода М. Холодний яр: роман. К.: Рад. письменник, 1971;
 Книга Юрія Горліс-Горського про Холодноярську Республіку «Холодний Яр».
 Вєтров, О. В. Таємниця Холодного Яру. Невідома війна: національний рух опору у 1940-1950-х роках [Текст] / О. В. Вєтров. — Черкаси: Вертикаль ; Видавець Кандич С. Г., 2009. — 266 с.

Geography of Cherkasy Oblast
Forests of Ukraine